Gardena High School (GHS) is a public high school in Harbor Gateway, Los Angeles, California, United States, adjacent to the City of Gardena. It serves grades 9 through 12 and is a part of the Los Angeles Unified School District.

Small Learning Communities
Gardena  High School has two magnets and two academies on campus: the Global Business Magnet, the Law and Public Service Magnet, the Creative Arts Academy and the Science, Technology, Engineering, Arts, and Mathematics Academy.

History
GHS opened in 1907. In Spring 1956, the junior high school classes stayed at the old Gardena High School while the high school classes moved into a new building designed by architects Henry L. Gogerty (1894–1990) and D. Stewart Kerr. Up until the opening of the new Gardena High School, high school students held morning shifts, while junior high school students held afternoon shifts. The junior high is now known as Peary Middle School.

It was in the Los Angeles City High School District until 1961, when it merged into LAUSD.

Attendance boundary
The school serves the City of Gardena, portions of Carson, and portions of Los Angeles (including Harbor Gateway and portions of Wilmington).

Features
The northern end of the campus has LAUSD staff housing, Sage Park Apartments. It takes up  of land. It opened in 2015. Its buildings have three and four stories each, and 90 units total are present.

Demographics
As of the school year 2008–09, there were a total of 3,186 students attending the high school.

59.2% Hispanic (1,885)
1.4% White (46)
33.1% Black (1,053)
0.6% Native American (19)
4.7% Asian (149)
1.1% Pacific Islander (34)

Notable alumni 

 Reggie Richardson Played defensive back for Utah Utes and played one season with the Los Angeles Rams
 Nate Ness Played Defensive Back for Arizona Wildcats, he signed with the Cleveland Browns as an undrafted free agent and also played for the Miami Dolphins, Seattle Seahawks, St. Louis Rams, Carolina Panthers and the Detroit Lions
 Steven C. Bradford (Class of 1978): California Assemblyman, 2009–2014.
 Enos Cabell: MLB, 1972–1986, with the Baltimore Orioles, Houston Astros, San Francisco Giants, Detroit Tigers, and the Los Angeles Dodgers.
 Wayne Collett: silver medalist in the 400 meters at the 1972 Summer Olympics in Munich.
 Dock Ellis (Class of 1963): MLB pitcher for the Pittsburgh Pirates, New York Yankees, Oakland Athletics, Texas Rangers, and New York Mets.
 George Farmer: NFL wide receiver, 1982–1984, 1987; attended Southern University, played for the Los Angeles Rams and Miami Dolphins.
 Glen Fukushima: Deputy Assistant U.S. Trade Representative for Japan and China, 1988–1990.
 Anthony Frederick: former Pepperdine standout; NBA player from 1987 to 1992.
 Warren Furutani: California Assemblyman, 2008–2012.
 Nesby Glasgow: NFL safety, 1979–1992; attended the University of Washington and was recognized as part of its Century Team.
 Dennis Gilbert: Sports agent, baseball executive and co-founder of the Professional Baseball Scouts Foundation.
 Gaston Green: NFL running back, 1988–1992, attended UCLA, played for the Los Angeles Rams and Denver Broncos. He was a Pro Bowl selection in 1991 as a Bronco.
 Don Horn: NFL quarterback with the Green Bay Packers; their first-round pick (All-American) out of San Diego State University.
 D.L. Hughley (Class of 1981): comedian and actor.
 Keith Lee: Played defensive back for the Colorado State Rams and drafted in the fifth round of the 1980 NFL draft by the Buffalo Bills but only played with the New England Patriots and the Indianapolis Colts
 Niecy Nash: comedian and actress.
 Vincent Okamoto: Japanese American Vietnam War veteran, later prosecutor and judge.
 Michael "Tyga" Nguyen-Stevenson: American rapper.
 Butch Patrick: actor, portrayed Eddie Munster on The Munsters.
 Kevin A. Ross: host, daytime syndicated court show America's Court with Judge Ross.
Leo Terrell (class of 1972): civil rights attorney and talk radio host on Talk Radio 790 KABC in Los Angeles.
 Glen Walker: NFL Played punter for the USC Trojans and for the Los Angeles Rams
 David Hollis played Defensive Back, Punt Returner, and Kick Returner for UNLV Rebels and for the Seattle Seahawks and the Kansas City Chiefs
 Raymond Burks Played linebacker for the UCLA Bruins and was drafted by the Kansas City Chiefs in the twelfth round of the 1977 NFL Draft
 Clarence Duren played defensive back for the California Golden Bears and played for the St. Louis Cardinals  and the San Diego Chargers.
 Windlan Hall played defensive back for the Arizona State Sun Devils and was drafted in the fourth round of the 1972 NFL draft by the San Francisco 49ers and also played for the Minnesota Vikings and the Washington Redskins (now known as the Washington Football Team)
 Steve Holden played wide receiver for Arizona State Sun Devils and was drafted in the first round of the 1973 NFL Draft by the Cleveland Browns and also played for the Cincinnati Bengals
 Charlie Evans played running back for the Utah Utes and the USC Trojans and was drafted in the fourteenth round of the 1971 NFL Draft by the New York Giants and also played for the Washington Redskins (also known as the Washington Football Team)
 Al Carmichael played running back for the USC Trojans and was drafted in the first round of the 1953 NFL Draft by the Green Bay Packers and also played for the Denver Broncos.
 Lowell Wagner played back for the USC Trojans and played for the New York Yankees (now the New York Giants) and played for the San Francisco 49ers.
 Ernie Smith was a tackle for the USC Trojans and played for the Green Bay Packers who was a one time pro bowler, one time all-pro, and a two time NFL champion.
 John Nolan played guard for the Santa Clara Broncos and played for the Los Angeles Buccaneers

References

External links
 

 Official Gardena High School website

Los Angeles Unified School District schools
High schools in Los Angeles
Public high schools in California
Harbor Gateway, Los Angeles
Carson, California
Gardena, California
Wilmington, Los Angeles
Educational institutions established in 1901
1901 establishments in California